Anastasios "Tasos" Sidiropoulos (Greek: Αναστάσιος "Τάσος" Σιδηρόπουλος; born 9 August 1979) is a Greek football referee. He referees at UEFA Europa League from the 2013–14 season.

References

External links
 
 
 
 

1979 births
Living people
Greek football referees
UEFA Europa League referees